Legislative elections were held in Åland on 15 October 1995 to elect members of the Lagtinget. The 30 members were elected for a four-year term by proportional representation.

Following the elections, the previous government of the Åland Centre, Freeminded Co-operation and Åland Social Democrats, was replaced by one formed of the Åland Centre and Freeminded Co-operation, as well as one independent.

Results

References

External links
Parties and Elections in Europe
Legislative Assembly elections

Elections in Åland
1995 elections in Finland
1995 in Finland
October 1995 events in Europe